The Luritja or Loritja people, also known as Kukatja or Kukatja-Luritja, are an Aboriginal Australian people of the Northern Territory. Their language is the Luritja dialect, a Western Desert language.

Name
The name Kukatja or Kukatj is one shared by four other distinct tribes throughout Australia. The root of the word seems to suggest pride in being "meat eaters" rather than people who scrounge for vegetables for sustenance.

The Northern Territory Kukatja were often referred to in the ethnographical literature by Arerrnte exonyms for them, either Loritja or Aluritja, which bore pejorative connotations. 

According to Kenny (2013), "The people living to the immediate west of the Western Aranda called themselves Kukatja or Loritja at the turn of the twentieth century. Today they call themselves Luritja or Kukatja-Luritja when referring to their ancestry and history.

Country
Their territory is immediately west of the Derwent River, that formed their frontier with the Arrernte. He defined them as dwelling west of the Gosse Range and Palm Valley on the south
MacDonnell Ranges. Their southern limits went as far as Tempe Downs, and they ranged southwest to Lake Amadeus, the George Gill Range, the Merandji (the Cleland Hills) and Inindi near Mount Forbes. They were also present round Palmer, Walker, and Rudall creeks.

According to AUSTLANG, two areas of Luritja speakers have been distinguished: southern groups, whose language is influenced by Yankunytjatjara language, living south of Hermmannsburg, and another group, referred to as Pintupi-Luritja, whose traditional land lies north-west and west of Hermannsburg, including Haasts Bluff, Papunya, Mt Liebig and Kintore.

Land rights
The Luritja people established the Luritja Land Association in 1974, which was the first Aboriginal land rights organisation in Central Australia. Over 350 Luritja people lived or intended to live on the land.

Ethnography
The first sustained, fundamental ethnographic work on the Kukatja was done by the Lutheran missionary Carl Strehlow, who produced six monumental volumes in German on them and the neighbouring Arerrnte, published between 1907 and 1920.

The Luritja, together with other central Australian peoples, were the object of the first attempt to undertake an examination of Sigmund Freud's psychoanalytic theories concerning "primitive" society in Australia when Géza Róheim did fieldwork among them for eight months in 1929.

Alternative names

 Aluratja. ( Iliaura exonym)
 Aluratji. (Ngalia exonym)
 Aluridi. (Pintupi and Pitjantjatjara exonym)
 Aluridja
 Gogadja
 Gugada
 Gugadja
 Juluridja
 Kukacha
 Kukadja
 Kukata (error)
 Lo-rit-ya
 Loorudgee
 Loorudgie
 Loritja (Aranda pejorative exonym)
 Luridja
 Luritja, Luritcha, Loritcha
 Lurritji
 Uluritdja
 Western Loritja

Source:

Language

Luritja people speak the Luritja language. The following are designated as Luritja words by R. H. Mathews.
 kanala. (grey kangaroo)
 katu (father)
 malu. (red kangaroo)
 papa inura. (wild dog).
 papa. (tame dog)
 yako. (mother)

Notable people
Harold Thomas (born 1947), designer of the Aboriginal flag
Molly Jugadai Napaltjarri (1954–2011), an artist.

Footnotes

References

Sources

Aboriginal peoples of the Northern Territory